Ride the High Country (released internationally as Guns in the Afternoon) is a 1962 American CinemaScope Western film directed by Sam Peckinpah and starring Randolph Scott, Joel McCrea, and Mariette Hartley. The supporting cast includes Edgar Buchanan, James Drury, Warren Oates, and Ron Starr. The film's script, though credited solely to veteran TV screenwriter N. B. Stone Jr., was – according to producer Richard E. Lyons – almost entirely the work of Stone's friend and colleague, William S. Roberts, and Peckinpah himself. 

In 1992, Ride the High Country was selected for preservation in the National Film Registry by the United States Library of Congress as being deemed "culturally, historically, or aesthetically significant

The film featured Scott's final screen performance.

Plot
In the early years of the 20th century, an aging ex-lawman, Steve Judd, is hired by a bank to transport gold from a high country mining camp to the town of Hornitos, California. Six miners were recently murdered trying to transport their gold on the one trail leading down from the crest of the Sierra Nevada. In his prime, Judd was a tough and respected lawman, but now his threadbare clothes and spectacles serve as reminders that he is long past his prime. Judd enlists the help of his old friend and partner Gil Westrum to guard the gold transfer. Gil, who had been making his living passing himself off as a legendary sharpshooter named The Oregon Kid, enlists the help of his young sidekick, Heck Longtree.

Judd, Gil and Heck hit the trail on horseback toward Coarsegold, a mining camp located in the Sierra foothills, north of the town of Fresno. Judd doesn't realize that Gil and Heck are planning to steal the gold for themselves — preferably with Judd's help, but without it if necessary. Along the way they stop for the night at the farm of Joshua Knudsen and his daughter Elsa. Knudsen is a domineering religious man who warns against those who "traffic in gold" and trades Bible verses with Judd at the dinner table. That night, Elsa and Heck secretly meet in the moonlight for conversation, but the elder Knudsen catches them and pulls her away. Back at the house, he admonishes and slaps her; even though her father had only met Heck that evening, "I can see that the boy is no good"- just as all her other boyfriends were no good. Elsa replies "I promised the next time you hit me you'd be sorry for it!"

The next morning, after the three men had left on the trail to the mining camp, she catches up to them and asks whether she can keep them company on the way. She announces that she is also going to Coarsegold, to marry a miner named Billy Hammond. He had previously proposed to her when he was in town, although she had not accepted his proposal back then. Along the way, Elsa and Heck flirt, and at one time he tries to force himself on her. Heck is stopped by Judd, and then punched by both Judd and Gil. He later apologizes to Elsa.

When they reach the mining camp, the two older men set up a tent to weigh and accept gold dust in individual bags for which they give receipts of deposit, with safe transport guaranteed by the bank.

Having brought her mother's wedding dress with her, Elsa and Billy are married in the camp's brothelthe only substantial building thereby a real retired judge who happens to be at the camp. The madam and prostitutes serve as "maid of honor" and "flower girls".  Then Billy forces Elsa to a room in the brothel for their wedding night even though she emphatically states "No, Billy, not here!";  he strikes her when she refuses to obey him. By now intoxicated and passed out, he fails to prevent his disreputable brothers Elder, Sylvus, Jimmy, and Henry from entering the room and attempting to rape her.

Outside, hearing her screams, Judd and Heck rescue Elsa from the brothel and the Hammonds and let her stay in their tent that night.

The next day, the miners of the camp organize a "miner's trial" (without any need for a judge) to force the outsiders to return Elsa to her "legal" husband; because they are outnumbered, former lawman Judd agrees to the miner's demands as "that's the law in places like this".  However, Gill wakes up the drunken judge and demands to see his license (which in fact is duly issued in Sacramento), and then keeps it. He forces the judge at gunpoint to agree that when asked if the judge has a license to marry, he must say no (because Gill has it).

This ruse works and the three men are allowed to leave the camp with the gold and Elsa.

Along the way, Judd talks to Gil about right and wrong and how that's "something you just know". After all the lost years working in disreputable places, he tells Gil that he's now grateful to have gained back some of his self-respect and intends on keeping it "with the help of you and that boy back there". When Gil asks if that's all he wants, Judd replies, "All I want is to enter my House justified."

Realizing Judd will never go along with his plan to steal the gold, Gil plans to take the gold without his help. During the night as Gil and Heck prepare to leave with the gold, Judd confronts them at gunpoint. Heck, after previously expressing a change of mind to Gil, gives up his gun immediately. Angered by his old friend's Gil's betrayal, Judd puts his gun away, then slaps Gil and challenges him to draw. Instead, Gil throws down his guns and accepts that Judd will turn him in when they return to town.

Judd is forced to change his plans when the Hammond brothers appear in hot pursuit of Elsa. They found out about the ruse and learned that the judge's license could be verified in Sacramento, proving the marriage legal.

In the ensuing gunfight, two of the brothers, Jimmy and Sylvus, are killed, and Billy, Elder and Henry give up and escape.

During the night, Gil leaves camp and heads back to the site of the gunfight, where he takes a horse and gun from one of the dead brothers. Then he follows Judd, Heck, and Elsa down the only trail. Meanwhile, Heck has shown himself to be trustworthy, and even though he will most likely go to prison, Elsa tells him she'll be there when he gets out. When they reach Elsa's farm, the Hammond brothers are waiting, having already killed her father. A gunfight breaks out and soon both Judd and Heck are wounded. Gil comes riding in to help his old friend, and together the pair insult and challenge the brothers to a face-to-face shootout in the open. When the dust settles, the three brothers are dead, but Judd is mortally wounded. He tells his old friend, "I don't want them to see this. I'll go it alone." When Gil pledges to take care of everything just like he would have, Judd says, "Hell, I know that. I always did. You just forgot it for a while, that's all." Judd casts a look back towards the high country and then dies.

Cast

 Randolph Scott as Gil Westrum 
 Joel McCrea as Steve Judd 
 Mariette Hartley as Elsa Knudsen 
 Ron Starr as Heck Longtree 
 Edgar Buchanan as Judge Tolliver 
 R. G. Armstrong as Joshua Knudsen 
 Jenie Jackson as Kate 
 James Drury as Billy Hammond 
 L. Q. Jones as Sylvus Hammond 
 John Anderson as Elder Hammond 

 John Davis Chandler as Jimmy Hammond 
 Warren Oates as Henry Hammond
 Byron Foulger as Abner Sampson (uncredited) 
 Frank Hagney as Miner (uncredited)
 Percy Helton as Luther Sampson (uncredited)
 Don Kennedy as Policeman on Street (uncredited)
 Jack Kenny as Miner (uncredited)
 Michael T. Mikler as Hank (uncredited)
 Carmen Phillips as Saloon girl (uncredited)

Production
Peckinpah flipped a coin in the presence of a producer to see which leading man got top billing, Scott or McCrea. Scott won the toss. However, in the opening credits, both stars' names are shown in the same shot, so both Scott and McCrea received equal top billing.

Filming locations
 20th Century Fox Movie Ranch, Malibu Creek State Park, 1925 Las Virgenes Road, Calabasas, California
 Bronson Canyon, Griffith Park, 4730 Crystal Springs Drive, Los Angeles, California
 Inyo National Forest, 351 Pacu Lane, Bishop, California
 Mammoth Lakes, California
 Merrimac, California

Reception
The film was released on the bottom half of a double bill. William Goldman says he spoke to an MGM executive at the time who says the film had tested strongly but they felt the film "didn't cost enough to be that good".

According to MGM records, the film lost $160,000.

Seen in a double bill with The Tartars, Bosley Crowther greatly preferred Ride the High Country, calling it a "perfectly dandy little Western" and "the most disarming little horse opera in months."  According to Crowther:
The two young people are quite good, especially Miss Hartley, a newcomer with real promise. R. G. Armstrong and Edgar Buchanan also contribute telling bits. We know little about the director and scenarist, but Mr. Peckinpah and Mr. Stone certainly have what it takes. And so, if anybody ever doubted it, do a couple of leathery, graying hombres named McCrea and Scott.

Ride the High Country was hailed as a success upon its release in Europe, winning first prize at the Cannes Film Festival. The film's reputation has only grown in following years, with Peckinpah's admirers citing it as his first great film. They also note that all of the themes of Peckinpah's later films, such as honor and ideals compromised by circumstance, the difficulty of doing right in an unjust world, the destruction of the West and its heroes by industrial modernity, and the importance of loyalty between men are all present in Ride the High Country. In 1964 the film won the prestigious Grand Prix of the Belgian Film Critics Association.

In his autobiography In the Arena (1995), Charlton Heston wrote that he was considering remaking the film in the late 1980s, presumably with Clint Eastwood as a co-star, but after viewing Ride the High Country Heston proposed Harry Julian Fink's script of Major Dundee (1965) to Peckinpah.

The original casting was for McCrea to play the Gil Westrum part and Randolph Scott to play Steve Judd.  After reading the script the two men agreed that a switch of roles was in order.

The film is recognized by American Film Institute in these lists:
 2008: AFI's 10 Top 10:
 Nominated Western Film

Notes
.

References

Further reading

 
   
 
 
 
 
 Hein, David. "Going Home Justified." The Living Church, July 27, 2014, pp. 16–17.
 Hein, David. "Ride the High Country: An Elegy on Leadership." The Statesman, March 24, 2014.  Republished in The Imaginative Conservative:

External links

Ride the High Country essay  by Stephen Prince on National Film Registry

 
 
 Ride the High Countries: The Essentials at Turner Classic Movies
 
 Ride the High Country essay by Daniel Eagan in America's Film Legacy: The Authoritative Guide to the Landmark Movies in the National Film Registry, A&C Black, 2010 , pages 578-580 

1962 films
1962 Western (genre) films
American Western (genre) films
1960s English-language films
Films about old age
Films directed by Sam Peckinpah
Films set in California
Films set in the 1900s
Metro-Goldwyn-Mayer films
United States National Film Registry films
Revisionist Western (genre) films
Films with screenplays by William Roberts (screenwriter)
1960s American films